, sometimes called , is a castle in Hiroshima, Japan that was the residence of the daimyō (feudal lord) of the Hiroshima Domain. The castle was originally constructed in the 1590s, but was destroyed by the atomic bombing on August 6, 1945. The castle was rebuilt in 1958, a replica of the original that now serves as a museum of Hiroshima's history before World War II.

History
Mōri Terumoto, one of Toyotomi Hideyoshi's council of Five Elders, built Hiroshima castle between 1589 and 1599. It was located on the delta of the Otagawa river. There was no Hiroshima city or town at the time, and the area was called Gokamura, meaning "five villages". Beginning in 1591, Mōri Terumoto moved from Yoshida-Kōriyama Castle and governed nine provinces from this castle, including much of what is now Shimane, Yamaguchi, Tottori, Okayama and Hiroshima Prefectures.

When construction on the castle began, Gokamura was renamed Hiroshima, as a more impressive name was called for. "Hiro" was taken from Ōe no Hiromoto, an ancestor of the Mōri family, and "Shima" was taken from Fukushima Motonaga, who helped Mōri Terumoto choose the castle site. Some accounts state that the name "Hiroshima", meaning "wide island", comes from the existence of several large islands in the delta of the Otagawa, near the castle's site.

Following the battle of Sekigahara in 1600, Mōri was forced out of the castle, retreating to Hagi in today's Yamaguchi Prefecture. Fukushima Masanori became the lord of Aki and Bingo Provinces (which today make up Hiroshima Prefecture) and of Hiroshima castle. However, the new Tokugawa shogunate forbade any castle construction without permission from Edo; this was part of how the shogunate kept the daimyōs from gaining power and overthrowing the shogunate. When Fukushima repaired the castle following a flood in 1619, he was dispatched to Kawanakajima in today's Nagano Prefecture. Asano Nagaakira then became lord of the castle.

From 1619 until the abolition of the feudal system during the Meiji Restoration (1869), the Asano family were lords of Aki and Bingo Provinces.

After the Meiji Restoration, the castle came to serve as a military facility, and the Imperial General Headquarters was based there during the First Sino-Japanese War in 1894–1895. The foundations of several of the GHQ outbuildings, just a few hundred paces from the castle's main tower, remain today.

During the final months of World War II, the castle served as the headquarters of the 2nd General Army and Fifth Division, stationed there to deter the projected Allied invasion of the Japanese mainland. The castle was destroyed in the atomic bomb blast of August 6, 1945, and for many years, it was believed the castle structure was blown away by the explosion that destroyed Hiroshima, but newly discovered evidence suggests the explosion only destroyed the lower pillars of the castle, and the rest of it collapsed as a result.

The present tower, constructed largely of concrete, was completed in 1958.

Daimyōs of Hiroshima
  Mōri Terumoto (1591–1600)*; 1,120,000 koku
  Fukushima Masanori (1600–1619); 498,223 koku
  Asano Nagaakira (1619–1632); 426,500 koku**
  Asano Mitsuakira (1632–1672)
  Asano Tsunaakira (1672–1673)
  Asano Tsunanaga (1673–1708)
  Asano Yoshinaga (1708–1752)
  Asano Munetsune (1752–1763)
  Asano Shigeakira (1763–1799)
  Asano Narikata (1799–1830)
  Asano Naritaka (1831–1858)
  Asano Yoshiteru (1858–1858)
  Asano Nagamichi (1858–1869)
  Asano Nagakoto (1869–1871)

*The years listed are those in which the lord occupied Hiroshima castle, not the years of his life.

**All of the lords after Asano Nagaakira enjoyed the same 426,500 koku.

Structure

The castle was originally constructed in wood, pine primarily, and had attached wings to the east and to the south. It was completed sometime between 1592 and 1599, and was designated a National Treasure in 1931. The reconstructed castle features the main tower (tenshu) only, which is made primarily of reinforced concrete. However, in 1994, a gate and a yagura in the ninomaru were re-constructed out of wood using the original methods.

An excellent example of a hirajiro'' or flatlands (plains) castle, Hiroshima castle once had three concentric moats in addition to the Otagawa river to the west (now called the Hongawa), which provided an additional natural barrier. The two outer moats were filled in during the late 19th and early 20th centuries, and much of what was once within the castle grounds is now modern urban area, including homes, schools, offices and shops. A number of secondary castle buildings, towers and turrets once stood, and a Shinto shrine called Hiroshima Gokoku Jinja is located within the innermost moat, having been moved there after 1945.

Within the castle walls, three trees survived the atomic bombing: a eucalyptus and a willow at approximately 740 m from the hypocenter, and a holly approximately 935 m from the hypocenter. Both specimens are preserved just beyond the Honmaru. Also located inside the Honmaru is the concrete bunker from which the first radio broadcast out of Hiroshima following the atomic bombing was made.

See also
 Japanese castle

Notes

References
 Hiroshima Castle tourist brochure obtained at the castle.
 James McMullen, "The Worship of Confucius in Hiroshima" Japonica Humboldtiana, vol. 16 (2013) pp. 83-107

Further reading
Benesch, Oleg. "Castles and the Militarisation of Urban Society in Imperial Japan," Transactions of the Royal Historical Society, Vol. 28 (Dec. 2018), pp. 107-134.

External links

 
 Junji Akechi, "New theory offered for collapse of Hiroshima Castle tower in the bombing" Chugoku Shimbun Website 
 
 Virtual tour of Hiroshima Castle examining its modern history on the Japan's Modern Castles YouTube channel

Castles in Hiroshima Prefecture
Tourist attractions in Hiroshima
Museums in Hiroshima
History museums in Japan
Houses completed in 1599
Historic Sites of Japan
Buildings and structures in Japan destroyed during World War II
Old National Treasures of Japan
Rebuilt buildings and structures in Japan
Lowland castles
Mōri clan